Classic Carpenters is the fourth studio album by Australian recording artist Dami Im, released on 22 April 2016 by Sony Music Australia. The album consists of cover versions of American vocal duo The Carpenters' songs. 
The album was certified Gold is Australia (more than 35000 units sales) in April 2017.

Im said "My intention wasn't to copy Karen's voice or her tone, our voices naturally sound so different. I tried to bring out the joy and the innocence in the songs while trying to sing them as honest and raw as I could as Dami, rather than pretending to be someone else." Adding, "With this album and through my live performances, I hope to be remembered as the girl who is a real musician at heart who speaks truthfully through her craft."

Promotional videos
On 15 April, Im released a video for "(They Long to Be) Close to You".

On 17 April, Im released a video for "There's a Kind of Hush".

On 19 April, Im released a video for "Yesterday Once More".

Critical reception
Cameron Adams from the Herald Sun gave the album 3 out of 5 saying; "There are two ways to tackle an album of covers of Carpenters' songs. You reinvent them or you recreate them. Here's Dami Im keeping it faithful for Mother's Day with lush, lovely remakes of "Yesterday Once More", "Close To You", "Rainy Days and Mondays" and so on". In a word, Adams described the album as "nice".

Track listing
 "(They Long to Be) Close to You" – 3:41
 "There's a Kind of Hush" – 3:01
 "Yesterday Once More" – 4:00
 "Superstar" – 3:10
 "Rainy Days and Mondays" – 3:27
 "This Masquerade" – 3:58
 "A Song for You" – 3:34
 "I Won't Last a Day Without You" – 3:11
 "I Need to Be in Love" – 3:53
 "Hurting Each Other" – 2:46
 "We've Only Just Begun" – 3:02

Charts

Weekly charts

Year-end charts

Certifications

Release history

References

2016 albums
Dami Im albums
Sony Music Australia albums
Covers albums